LGM can refer to:
Lady International Correspondence Chess Grand Master
Last Glacial Maximum
Left-Green Movement
Libre Graphics Meeting
Little Green Men Games
Let's Go Mets
Little Green Men, stereotypical portrayal of extraterrestrials
LGM-1, (for "Little Green Men") nickname of the first pulsar discovered
LGM-2, nickname for KIC 8462852

LGM - silo-launched surface-attack guided-missile
LGM-25 Titan
LGM-25 Titan I ICBM
LGM-25 Titan II ICBM
LGM-30 Minuteman ICBM
LGM-118 Peacekeeper ICBM

See also 
 Little Green Men (disambiguation)